Nikos Tsaganias (born 1915, date of death unknown) was a Greek footballer. He played in one match for the Greece national football team in 1938. He was also part of Greece's team for their qualification matches for the 1938 FIFA World Cup.

References

External links
 

1915 births
Year of death missing
Greek footballers
Greece international footballers
Place of birth missing
Association footballers not categorized by position